Bulgurlu can refer to:

 Bulgurlu, Horasan
 Bulgurlu, Üsküdar
 Bulgurlu—Libadiye (Istanbul Metro)